Pierre-Étienne Guyot (21 May 1905 – 13 October 1985) was a French sports executive.

Paris FC and Paris Saint-Germain 
In the summer of 1970, Guyot was collaborating with Guy Crescent and Henri Patrelle to form a new football club. Eventually, it was agreed upon that Guyot and Crescent's virtual Paris FC would merge with Patrelle's Stade Saint-Germain to form Paris Saint-Germain. Guyot became the first president of the newly-founded club. However, he was succeeded in this role after one year by Crescent. In 1972, PSG split into two, and PFC was re-formed; Guyot subsequently returned to preside the club for one year.

References

Bibliography 
Fédération française de golf Guide Fédéral 1976, Pierre-Étienne Guyot, F.F.G

1905 births
1985 deaths
Sportspeople from Paris
French football chairmen and investors
Paris Saint-Germain F.C. presidents